The MV Chambo is a passenger ship operating on Lake Malawi. It is named after the local name for cichlids living in the lake, Chambo. Because the MV Ilala is out of service regularly for maintenance, the Chambo was acquired to assure uninterrupted service between the Malawian side of the lake, the Mozambican shore and Likoma Island. Vehicles can board the ship using the mount at the front of vessel.

References

Ferries
Lake Malawi
Transport in Malawi
Ships of Malawi